First National Business Park is located at 144th & Dodge Streets, just north of Boys Town in West Omaha. CB Richard Ellis regards the park as Omaha's "most prestigious location". It was a significant part of the largest annexation in Omaha's history, which former mayor Hal Daub called for in 1999.

Founded in 1997, the  business park is notable as one of the most desirable locations for business parks in the Midwestern United States. The Park had its last building commitment within a year of its founding. Harlan Noddle, a past chairman of the University of Nebraska Foundation and a prominent Omaha businessman, was involved in building the park.

It was announced  on October 23, 2008 that Yahoo will be coming to the Omaha Metro Area. Yahoo stated that the First National Business Park will be the home to the customer care center that would open the following April.

See also
 Economy of Omaha, Nebraska
 First National Bank of Omaha

References

Economy of Omaha, Nebraska
West Omaha, Nebraska